The Surf City Cup is a pre-season friendly football tournament, inaugurated in 2019, and played at the Gold Coast Croatia Sports Centre.

Brisbane Roar were the inaugural champions in 2019.

Format
If the match results in a draw in extra time, a penalty shootout will decide the winner.

Honours

Recent matches

2019

See also

External links
 Official Website

References

Recurring sporting events established in 2019
Soccer cup competitions in Australia
National association football cups
2019 establishments in Australia